Madina Rakhim (born 9 April 1985) is a Kazakhstani former tennis player. She is an elder sister of professional player Amina.

Biography
Rakhim, a right-handed player, made her debut for the Kazakhstan Fed Cup team in 2004, appearing in four ties.

From 2006 to 2007, she played college tennis in the United States for Wichita State and became only their second ever female to compete in the NCAA Division I Singles Championship.

At the 2007 Summer Universiade in Bangkok, Rakhim and sister Amina were runners-up to Chinese Taipei's Chan Yung-jan and Chuang Chia-jung in the women's doubles, to claim a silver medal for Kazakhstan.

In 2008, she featured in another four Fed Cup ties for her national team. She finished her Fed Cup career having lost only one of her four singles rubbers and in partnership with her sister was unbeaten in four doubles rubbers.

ITF Circuit finals

Doubles: 1 (0–1)

References

External links
 
 
 

1985 births
Living people
Kazakhstani female tennis players
Wichita State Shockers women's tennis players
Universiade medalists in tennis
Universiade silver medalists for Kazakhstan
Medalists at the 2007 Summer Universiade
Sportspeople from Karaganda
21st-century Kazakhstani women